Stocksee is a municipality in the district of Segeberg, in Schleswig-Holstein, Germany. Stocksee is located at a lake of the same name.

References

Municipalities in Schleswig-Holstein
Segeberg